is a Japanese manga series written and illustrated by Sho Yamazaki. It was serialized on Shueisha's Shōnen Jump+ website from May 2020 to January 2023, with its chapters collected into seven tankōbon volumes as of December 2022.

Premise 
The series focuses on Takuma Kurosumi, the member of a yakuza group who falls in love with the dentist Tomori Shirayuki during an appointment under the belief that Tomori is a woman; in reality, he is a cross-dressing man of a rival yakuza group.

Production 
In 2019, Sho Yamazaki published a one-shot manga on the free mobile app and website Shōnen Jump+ on October 5. At the time of its release, the one-shot won first place on a Twitter trend, exceeding 2.6 million views and becoming the most viewed one-shot work by Shōnen Jump+ in history. Due to the popularity of the one-shot, Yamazaki decided to adapt it as a full-length serialization on Shōnen Jump+.

Publication 
Written and illustrated by Sho Yamazaki, Excuse Me Dentist, It's Touching Me! was serialized on Shueisha's online magazine Shōnen Jump+ from May 16, 2020, to January 21, 2023. Shueisha has collected its chapters into individual tankōbon volumes. The first volume was released on October 2, 2020. As of December 2, 2022, seven volumes have been released.

The series is since August 28, 2020, also released in English simultaneously with its Japanese release through Shueisha's Manga Plus service.

Volume list

Reception 
As of February 2021, Excuse Me Dentist, It's Touching Me! had over 3 million views on the Shōnen Jump+ platform. As of July 2021, the manga had over 100.000 copies in circulation.

Notes

References

External links 
 
Excuse Me Dentist, It's Touching Me! on Manga Plus

2020 webcomic debuts
Comedy anime and manga
Cross-dressing in anime and manga
Japanese comedy webcomics
Shōnen manga
Shueisha manga
Webcomics in print
Yakuza in anime and manga